Union Black is the fourth album from Welsh reggae metal band Skindred. It was released on 25 April 2011 in the United Kingdom and on 1 July 2011 in Europe. The album is notable for featuring more usage of dubstep, hip hop and drum and bass elements than previous works.

Background 
The album was produced by James Loughrey at Britannia Row Studios. Benji Webbe stated in an interview with Kerrang! that he wanted to get some collaborations on the new album and had originally hoped to get Corey Taylor of Slipknot and Stone Sour to sing on the album, but due to other commitments this was not possible. He went on to say that after sending an incomplete version of the song "Warning" to friend Jacoby Shaddix (of Papa Roach), Shaddix flew into the studio to record some extra vocals for the track. After the alterations, "Warning" was released as the first single from the album, was debuted on BBC Radio 1's Rock show with Daniel P Carter and has subsequently received airtime on BBC 6 Music and BBC Guernsey, being played by Don Letts and Bruce Dickinson. The video debuted on YouTube on 6 April. The album's art is contributed by graphic artist Tim Fox. The album was promoted with a UK tour, with support acts Chiodos and Me Vs Hero. On 30 June, the band's official Facebook page released "Doom Riff" as a free download, and the day after, on 1 July, the video for "Cut Dem" was released as the second single from the album. On 6 September the band announced a deal with Australian Record label with 3 Wise/Sony Records to release the album on 23 September, along with the announcement of their tour with Hollywood Undead after the cancellation of 2011's Soundwave Revolution.

Critical reception

The album has been well received. The NewReview gave the album 4.5 out of 5, remarking that "there is nothing similar to Union Black".

Track listing

Personnel
 Benji Webbe – vocals, synthesiser
 Daniel Pugsley – bass
 Mikey Demus – guitar, backing vocals
 Dirty Arya – drums

Additional personnel
 Jacoby Shaddix – additional vocals on track 2
 James Loughrey – production, engineering
 John Cox – assistant engineer
 Tim Fox – design

Chart performance

References

2011 albums
Skindred albums
BMG Rights Management albums